Puurijärvi-Isosuo National Park is a national park in the Pirkanmaa and Satakunta regions of Finland. The area consists mainly of large swamp areas and the Puurijärvi lake. Moreover, the alluvial shores of Kokemäenjoki are on almost natural state here.

See also 
 List of national parks of Finland
 Protected areas of Finland

References

External links
 
  National Park

National parks of Finland
Protected areas established in 1993
Geography of Pirkanmaa
Geography of Satakunta
Tourist attractions in Pirkanmaa
Tourist attractions in Satakunta